Woodland Hills is a city in Utah County, Utah, United States. It is part of the Provo–Orem Metropolitan Statistical Area. The population was 1,521 at the 2020 census. Woodland Hills became a city at the end of 2000.

As of the 2000 census, Woodland Hills had the highest median income in the state of Utah.

Geography

Demographics

As of the census of 2000, there were 941 people, 500 households, and 207 families residing in the town. The population density was 343.3 people per square mile (132.6/km2). There were 229 housing units at an average density of 83.5 per square mile (32.3/km2). The racial makeup of the town was 97.24% White, 0.21% African American, 0.21% Native American, 0.11% Asian, 1.28% from other races, and 0.96% from two or more races. Hispanic or Latino of any race were 2.44% of the population.

There were 220 households, out of which 55.5% had children under the age of 18 living with them, 90.9% were married couples living together, 2.3% had a female householder with no husband present, and 5.9% were non-families. 3.6% of all households were made up of individuals, and 0.5% had someone living alone who was 65 years of age or older. The average household size was 4.28 and the average family size was 4.44.

In the town the population was spread out, with 43.6% under the age of 18, 8.1% from 18 to 24, 23.0% from 25 to 44, 18.4% from 45 to 64, and 7.0% who were 65 years of age or older. The median age was 22 years. For every 100 females, there were 101.1 males. For every 100 females age 18 and over, there were 97.4 males.

The median income for a household in the town was $80,854, and the median income for a family was $82,358. Males had a median income of $66,042 versus $32,361 for females. The per capita income for the town was $25,184. About 2.6% of families and 3.0% of the population were below the poverty line, including 2.2% of those under age 18 and 5.7% of those age 65 or over.

See also

 List of cities and towns in Utah

References

External links

 

Cities in Utah County, Utah
Cities in Utah
Provo–Orem metropolitan area
Populated places established in 1970